The 1997 Canadian Figure Skating Championships were held on February 6–9, 1997 in Vancouver, British Columbia. They were the figure skating national championship which determines the national champions of Canada. The event was organized by Skate Canada, the nation's figure skating governing body. Skaters competed at the senior, junior, and novice levels in the disciplines of men's singles, women's singles, pair skating, and ice dancing. The results of this competition were used to pick the Canadian team to the 1997 World Championships.

After this year, novice-level events were held no longer held at the Canadian Championships. They were reintroduced at 2010.

Senior results

Men

Ladies

Pairs

Ice dancing

Junior results

Men

Ladies

Pairs

Ice dancing

Novice results

Men

Ladies

Pairs

Ice dancing

References

External links
 Senior-level results
 Junior-level results 
 Novice-level results

Canadian Figure Skating Championships
Figure skating
Canadian Figure Skating Championships
Sport in Vancouver
1997 in British Columbia